Sosnovy Bor is a rural locality (a settlement) in Nagornoye Rural Settlement, Petushinsky District, Vladimir Oblast, Russia. The population was 179 as of 2010. There are 2 streets.

Geography 
Sosnovy Bor is located on the Sheredar River, 36 km west of Petushki (the district's administrative centre) by road. Gostets is the nearest rural locality.

References 

Rural localities in Petushinsky District